France Mongeau (born 1961) is a Quebec educator and poet. Her collection Lumières received the Prix Émile-Nelligan in 1986.

Early life and career
Mongeau was born in Trois-Rivières. She teaches French and literature at the Collège Édouard-Montpetit and has also taught at the Université du Québec à Montréal. Her first collection Lettre en miroir was published in 1980.  She has collaborated in the production of a number of artist's books: Ségala with Anne-Laure Héritier-Blanc received the Prix Saint-Denys-Garneau in 2005.

Selected works 
 Indices noirs (1987)
 La Danse de Julia (1996)
 La Mer est pierre d'attente (2003)
 Le Guet du renard (2004)
 Estancia en verde / La chambre verte (2006), was a finalist for the Prix Alain-Grandbois
 Lectures d'un lieu (2010)

References 

1961 births
Living people
Canadian poets in French
Canadian women poets
20th-century Canadian poets
20th-century Canadian women writers
21st-century Canadian poets
21st-century Canadian women writers
People from Trois-Rivières
Writers from Quebec
Academic staff of the Université du Québec à Montréal